Cachipay is a municipality and town of Colombia in the Tequendama Province, part of the department of Cundinamarca. Cachipay borders Quipile in the west, Zipacón in the east, Anolaima in the north and La Mesa in the south.

Etymology 
The name Cachipay is probably derived from the Chibcha name for a fruit similar to the typical Colombian fruit corozo.

History 
The history of the present municipality of Cachipay dates back at least to the Herrera Period, from which ceramics have been found in the current vereda Tocarema, dated at 2750 years BP (750 BCE).
The region before the Spanish conquest of the Muisca was inhabited by the Panche people, who were in constant conflict with the Muisca inhabiting the Altiplano Cundiboyacense to the east.

Tocarema was the site of the Battle of Tocarema on August 20, 1538, where an alliance of Muisca guecha warriors and troops of the Spanish conquistador Gonzalo Jiménez de Quesada confronted and submitted the Panche, due to their superior weaponry, cavalry and the dogs trained for war.

Modern Cachipay was not founded until November 26, 1982.

Gallery

References 

Municipalities of Cundinamarca Department
Populated places established in 1982